Duncan Harrigan (26 June 1921 – 16 February 2005) was a Scottish footballer who played as a centre forward in the Football League for Crewe Alexandra and Chester.

References

1921 births
2005 deaths
Footballers from Paisley, Renfrewshire
Association football forwards
Scottish footballers
St Mirren F.C. players
Crewe Alexandra F.C. players
Aston Villa F.C. players
Chester City F.C. players
Colwyn Bay F.C. players
English Football League players